= Vietnamese Council =

Vietnamese Council may refer to:

- Council of Ministers, Government of Vietnam (1980–1992)
- Council of State, former name (1980–1992) of the Standing Committee of the National Assembly, the highest standing body of the National Assembly of Vietnam
